Loren Douglas Hagen (February 25, 1946 – August 7, 1971) was a United States Army Special Forces officer and a recipient of the United States military's highest decoration—the Medal of Honor—for his actions during the Vietnam War as Recon Team (RT) leader of a small special reconnaissance unit "RT Kansas", manned by USASF Green Berets and highly trained Montagnard commandos from Task Force One Advisory Element aka Command & Control North, a division of Studies and Observations Group in the Vietnam War. Hagen was the last member of the U.S. Army to earn a Medal of Honor in the Vietnam War.

Biography
Hagen was born February 25, 1946, in Fargo, North Dakota, son of Loren H. Hagen (1919–2002) and Eunice H. Harris Hagen (1921–2008). The family lived in Moorhead, Minnesota, where he worked summers as a farm laborer and as a lifeguard. He is an Eagle Scout and was credited with saving the life of a swimmer at the Moorhead swimming pool in 1968. He had two brothers: Michael and Jeffrey.

His father was transferred to Decatur, Illinois, his sophomore year of high school. He attended MacArthur High School in Decatur, where he was student council president and graduated in 1964. After high school he returned to Minnesota and enrolled at North Dakota State University, where he received a Bachelor of Science degree in engineering, industrial science and math. After college, he enlisted in the U.S. Army. He attended Officer Candidate School (OCS) at Fort Belvoir, Virginia, and then was trained at Fort Bragg, North Carolina, and became a member of the 5th Special Forces, Green Berets.

Career and command
Hagen joined the Army from his birth city of Fargo, North Dakota in 1968, and by August 7, 1971 was serving as a first lieutenant in command of special Recon Team  (RT) Kansas, a mixed unit of U.S. Army Special Forces and Montagnard commandos from Task Force One Advisory Element (TF1AE), also known as Command & Control North (CCN) with MACV-SOG (name changed in March 1971 to "TAG" Training Advisory Group, U.S. Army).

Facing massed NVA forces
Hagan's special reconnaissance team had landed and secured their position for the overnight mission almost within sight of the Hanoi High Command's most critical new venture of late 1971, the first six-inch fuel pipeline laid across the Vietnamese DMZ, which was essential a few months in the future when entire tank battalions rolled through the area for the Vietnam War's largest offensive. The North Vietnamese Army (NVA) 304th Division was already massing there, plus a regiment of the 308th Division, in preparation for the 1972 Easter Offensive.

Enemy attack
During an enemy attack on August 7, in an assembly area of the North Vietnamese Army in the A Shau Valley of the Republic of Vietnam, Hagen led his small recon team's defense, and when USASF Sgt. Bruce Allen Berg was hit by a rocket in one of the team's bunkers, Hagen crawled towards Berg's position through heavy fire in an attempt to assist Berg, returning fire as he proceeded. Mortally wounded in the process, Hagen was later posthumously awarded the Medal of Honor for his actions.  Berg was never found and he was initially listed as Missing in Action, Body Not Recovered.  Berg was 21 at the time of his loss.  He was later declared Killed in Action, Body Not Recovered (KIA/BNR).

Other members of Recon Team Kansas were: USASF SSG Oran Bingham, USASF SGT William R. "Bill" Queen (DSC awarded for his actions), USASF SGT Bruce Allen Berg, USASF SGT William "Bill" Rimondi, USASF SGT Anthony G. "Tony Andersen" (DSC awarded for his actions), and eight Bru Degar (Montagnard) Commandos (no names available).

Hagen, aged 25 at his death, was buried in Arlington National Cemetery, Arlington County, Virginia.

Medal of Honor citation

First Lieutenant Hagen's official Medal of Honor citation reads:

Awards and decorations
1LT Hagen was awarded the following through out his military career:

See also

A Shau Valley
List of Medal of Honor recipients for the Vietnam War

References

External links

.

1946 births
1971 deaths
American military personnel killed in the Vietnam War
United States Army Medal of Honor recipients
Burials at Arlington National Cemetery
Members of the United States Army Special Forces
People from Fargo, North Dakota
People from Moorhead, Minnesota
People from Decatur, Illinois
United States Army officers
Vietnam War recipients of the Medal of Honor
United States Army personnel of the Vietnam War
Military personnel missing in action
Military personnel from Illinois
Military personnel from Minnesota
Military personnel from North Dakota